Pranav Sharma (प्रणव शर्मा)  is an astronomer and science historian known for his work on the history of the Indian Space Program. He has curated Space Museum at the B. M. Birla Science Centre (Hyderabad, India). He was the in-charge of the history of the Indo-French scientific partnership project supported by the Embassy of France in India. He is a national award-winning science communicator and has extensively worked in the popularization of astronomy education in India. He also serves as an Advisor to the France India Foundation. He has co-authored a book Essential Astrophysics: Interstellar Medium to Stellar Remnants.

References 

Astronomy
Social work
Indian scientific authors
Indian scientists
Living people
Year of birth missing (living people)